Upper Macdonald is a small village 108 km north of Sydney, in the state of New South Wales, Australia. It is located in the City of Hawkesbury on the Macdonald River (a tributary of the Hawkesbury River) north of St Albans. The village used to be known as Howick.

References

Suburbs of Sydney
City of Hawkesbury
Hawkesbury River